Dave Hewitt (born 4 November 1995) is an English professional rugby league footballer who plays as a  for Rochdale Hornets. He moved from Oldham (Heritage № 1347) in the Betfred Championship.

Background
Hewitt was born in St Helens, Merseyside, England.

Career
Hewitt is an England Schoolboys and England Academy international.

He was in the Saints Academy system and played his junior rugby league with the Bold Miners club. He has previously played on loan from St. Helens at Oldham in 2015.

In 2016 Hewitt joined the Sheffield Eagles on a full-time deal. In July 2016 he joined Oldham on loan from the Eagles.

In October 2016 he joined the Roughyeds on a permanent deal.

References

External links
Oldham profile
Sheffield Eagles profile

1995 births
Living people
English rugby league players
Oldham R.L.F.C. players
Rochdale Hornets players
Rugby league five-eighths
Rugby league halfbacks
Rugby league players from St Helens, Merseyside
Sheffield Eagles players
St Helens R.F.C. players